Actaea, the Nymph of the Shore is an oil painting by Frederic Leighton, first exhibited in 1868.

History 
In 1868, Leighton was elected Royal Academician, and the Academy had six contributions from his prolific palette which fixed his reputation as the creator of ideal form. His style bore the unmistakable influence of his recent visits to Greece, and projected new visions of themes which had attracted him in childhood. Among the mythological subjects exhibited in 1868 was Actaea, the Nymph of the Shore.

Subject 
Actaea was one of the Nereids of Greek mythology: the fifty daughters of the sea-god Nereus who lived in the Aegean Sea. The seashore depicted in the painting was familiar to Leighton from his visit to Rhodes in 1867.

Description 
The picture represents a small, full-length figure, partially nude, in white drapery, lying on the seashore. The landscape with the sea is a vision of one of the islands of the Greek seas. According to Edgcumbe Staley, "It is a beautiful work, full of ideal grace and refinement."

References

Sources 

 Ash, Russell (1995). Lord Leighton. London: Pavilion Books Limited. p. 41 [Plate 13].
 Jones, Stephen, et al. (1996). Frederic Leighton, 1830–1896. Royal Academy of Arts, London: Harry N. Abrams, Inc. pp. 28, 63–64, 79, 119, 165
 Rhys, Ernest (1900). Frederic Lord Leighton: An Illustrated Record of his Life and Work. London: George Bell & Sons. pp. 25–26.
 Staley, Edgcumbe (1906). Lord Leighton of Stretton. London: The Walter Scott Publishing Co., Ltd.; New York: Charles Scribner's Sons. pp. 75–76, 215, 219.
 "Actaea, the Nymph of the Shore". National Gallery of Canada. Retrieved 4 August 2022.

1868 paintings
Mythological paintings by Frederic Leighton
Nude art
Women in art
Fish in art
Water in art
Paintings depicting Greek myths